Zon Moe Aung (born 8 July 1993) is a footballer from Burma, and a left winger for the Myanmar U-23 football team and Zwekapin United. He was born in Yangon.

Early career
Zon Moe Aung was born in South Okkala, Yangon Division. He played High School Competition when he was three years old. He was selected for School Selection to play High school Competition from Grade 4 to Grade 11. In 2009, Zon Moe Aung was chosen for Yangon United Youth Team. He studied at Yangon Academy and was chosen for Yangon Youth Team. He wanted to be one of Myanmar National Team player. So, he transferred to Zwekapin United on loan in 2012. He showed his surprising talent in Zwekapin United. He played three years in Zwekapin United. In 2015, Yangon United took him back. He was chosen in Yangon United First Line-up because of Yazar Win Thein retired. He played 2015 Myanmar National League and got MNL Champion for first time.

Club career
2015 Myanmar National League = Champion

National career
2015 SEA Games Football = Silver

External links

Zon Moe Aung
profile

References

1993 births
Living people
People from Yangon Region
Burmese footballers
Myanmar international footballers
Association football fullbacks
Southeast Asian Games silver medalists for Myanmar
Southeast Asian Games medalists in football
Competitors at the 2015 Southeast Asian Games